Theodore Joseph Wojnar (born October 21, 1930) is a former rear admiral in the United States Coast Guard.

Biography
Wojnar is a native of Holyoke, Massachusetts. He attended the University of Massachusetts Amherst and Rensselaer Polytechnic Institute.

Career
Wojnar graduated from the United States Coast Guard Academy in 1953. He was then assigned to the USCGC Eastwind (WAGB-279) and served with the International Ice Patrol.

After serving aboard the USCGC Chincoteague (WAVP-375), Wojnar was stationed in Milwaukee, Wisconsin and Honolulu, Hawaii. Later, he was given overseas assignments in Yokosuka, Japan and London, England and at Réunion, France.

Wojnar's additional assignments include serving as Chief of the Civil Engineering Division of the Coast Guard before assuming command of Coast Guard District 13 in 1986.

During his career, Wojnar was awarded the Legion of Merit, the Meritorious Service Medal, the Coast Guard Commendation Medal, the Coast Guard Achievement Medal, the Commandant's Letter of Commendation Ribbon and the Arctic Service Medal.

References

People from Holyoke, Massachusetts
United States Coast Guard admirals
Recipients of the Legion of Merit
United States Coast Guard Academy alumni
University of Massachusetts Amherst alumni
Rensselaer Polytechnic Institute alumni
Living people
1930 births
Military personnel from Massachusetts